The Framingham Secondary (formerly the Framingham Subdivision) is a railroad line in the U.S. state of Massachusetts.  The line runs from Mansfield northwest to Framingham along a former New York, New Haven and Hartford Railroad line.  Its south end is at Amtrak's Northeast Corridor, over which CSX has trackage rights to reach the Middleboro Subdivision at Attleboro and the Boston Subdivision in Boston (via the Fairmount Line).  Its north end is at the Framingham/Worcester Line; the Fitchburg Subdivision continues northwest from Framingham.

Special MBTA Commuter Rail trains use the line between Mansfield and Walpole for access to Foxboro station, which is used for New England Patriots home games and other major events at Gillette Stadium.

History

The Foxborough Branch Railroad was incorporated in 1862 to provide a rail connection from Mansfield through Foxborough to Walpole. In 1867, it became the Mansfield and Framingham Railroad, with a new charter allowing it to connect to the Boston, Clinton and Fitchburg Railroad and Boston and Worcester Railroad at Framingham. The line was completed on May 1, 1870. On January 1, 1873, it was leased to the Boston, Clinton and Fitchburg Railroad for fifty years, before merging with that railroad on June 1, 1875.

On June 1, 1876, the line became part of the Boston, Clinton, Fitchburg and New Bedford Railroad with the merger of the Boston, Clinton and Fitchburg Railroad with the New Bedford Railroad, forming an overall network of 126.2 miles of track. In 1879, the Boston, Clinton, Fitchburg and New Bedford Railroad was leased to the Old Colony Railroad for 999 years, before being consolidated with the Old Colony in 1883. In 1893, it became part of the New York, New Haven and Hartford Railroad as part of the lease of the entire Old Colony Railroad network.

Passenger service ceased in 1933. The line passed to Penn Central and Conrail, and was assigned to CSX Transportation as its Framingham Subdivision in the 1999 breakup of Conrail. Effective June 17, 2015, the state purchased the line for $23 million with the intent to upgrade it for faster game day service and eventual full-time passenger service. By 2021,  of continuous welded rail had been installed.

See also
 List of CSX Transportation lines

References

External links

Rail infrastructure in Massachusetts
Old Colony Railroad lines